Oʻtgan kunlar is a 1969 Uzbek film directed by Yoʻldosh Aʼzamov, based on the 1925 novel Oʻtgan kunlar. The film stars Oʻlmas Alixoʻjayev and Gulchehra Jamilova in the main roles as the lovers Otabek and Kumush, with Abbos Bakirov, Pirmuhamedov Rahim Nabi Rakhimov, Habib Narimanov, Hamza Umarov Javlon Khamraev, Razzaq Khamraev, Maryam Yakubov and Gulchehra Zufarov.

Plot
The film is set in Tashkent, around the beginning of the 19th century, and tells the story of the lives of the upper class society of the period. The film follows the story of lovers Otabek and Kumush against the background of civil strife between the rulers and people.

References

Uzbek-language films
Uzbekfilm films
Soviet-era Uzbek films
Soviet romantic drama films
Films based on novels
Uzbekistani drama films